The  is a tunnel on the Kan-Etsu Expressway in Japan that runs through Mt. Tanigawa from Minakami, Gunma to Yuzawa, Niigata. The northern tube was opened in 1985 and the southern tube was opened in 1991.

References

Road tunnels in Japan